Robert Joseph Coffy (24 October 1920 – 15 July 1995) was a French Roman Catholic cardinal and Archbishop of Marseille.

Early life and education
Coffy was born on 24 October 1920 in Le Biot. His father was a carpenter. He entered the Seminary in Lyon and was ordained to the priesthood 28 October 1944. He carried out pastoral work in Annecy for a year in 1946. He taught as a faculty member where he had been taught in 1948. In the diocese of Annecy he was transferred to be a faculty member of its major seminary from 1949 to 1952, becoming its rector in 1952.

Episcopate
He was appointed as Bishop of Gap by Pope Paul VI in 1967. He was appointed to the metropolitan see of Albi on 15 June 1974. He was transferred to the archdiocese of Marseille by Pope John Paul II on 13 April 1985.

Cardinalate

Archbishop Coffy was created Cardinal-Priest of  San Luigi Maria Grignion de Montfort in the consistory of 28 June 1991. He resigned the government of the archdiocese in 1995, dying shortly afterward.

References

External links
GCatholic.org

1920 births
1995 deaths
20th-century French cardinals
Archbishops of Albi
Bishops of Gap
Archbishops of Marseille
Cardinals created by Pope John Paul II